is a Japanese manga artist and one of Japan's most prominent illustrators of female characters. Other notable works include  (adapted into an anime television series in 1983), and the gag series . Eguchi married idol  in 1990.

Biography

Hisashi began drawing at an early age, fascinated by the then-starting Japanese TV broadcasting. He got to know manga through Osamu Tezuka's Astro Boy. During his childhood, other superheroes like Ultraman and Ultra Seven also gripped him.

That same year, his  was a finalist at Akatsuka. The publication of Hisashi's baseball manga Susume!! Pirates followed in 1979 as a reward for winning the Young Jump contest.

After deciding to become a professional manga artist, Eguchi began drawing female characters: "I thought it was strange not to have girls. Also, I knew that it would be popular if the girls were cute." In the animation field, he worked as a character designer for Roujin Z, Mujin Wakusei Survive, and Otaku no Seiza and had the anime Eguchi Hisashi no Kotobuki Goro Show based on his work. Eguchi used his now current wife as a model for Roujin Z Haruko. Perfect Blue characters were based on Hisashi's designs. In 1990, the short story manga collection  was adapted into an OVA, which mixed anime, live action and puppetry. Eguchi (on his favorite scene)“[Nantoka Narudesho] was a story of a blind girl, and it’s dark all the way through. The dark scene continues for a long period of time. I heard that animator had a hard time. It was all black and he used various ideas for that."

Eguchi stated that American pop art has been an influence on his work, citing artists such as Roy Lichtenstein and Andy Warhol. Hisashi describes his style as simple: "I like to use organized lines. The less lines the better".

In 1994, Eguchi founded Comic Cue, an alternative yearly manga magazine: "I wanted to make something like the all-star game in baseball. Or Avengers. All-hero, I wanted to have a festival of Avengers. All the heroes!  With all my favorite artists". Katsuhiro Otomo was a contributor to the first issue.

Advertising
Eguchi's eye on beauty and fashion has granted him several jobs on advertising:
  covers.
 Flyers to promote his home town, Minamata.
 Hisashi Eguchi x atré "My Favorite Town. Kichijōji".
 CD Jackets: "Shit Happening", mini album "Lodge"; "Ging Nang Boyz", album "君と僕の第三次世界大戦的恋愛革命".
 Denon D-F07 manual cover.
 Denny's Japan.
 Kanebo Ltd. Xanax.
 Acer Inc. Intel Core i5.
  PlayStation game.
 Several Telephone card designs.

Notes
Japanese

References

External links 
 
 Hisashi Eguchi at Media Arts Database 
 
 
 
  (Illustrations)
 

1956 births
Living people
People from Minamata, Kumamoto
Manga artists from Kumamoto Prefecture
Japanese illustrators